Devadasu is a 1974 Telugu romance film directed by Vijaya Nirmala based on Sarat Chandra Chattopadhyay's Devdas. Ramesh Naidu composed the film's music. The film was edited by Kotagiri Gopala Rao, while V. S. R. Swamy provided the cinematography. The film was a commercial failure at the box office.

Cast 

 Krishna as Devadas
 Vijaya Nirmala as Parvathy
 Jayanthi as Chandramukhi
 Jaggayya as Devadas's father
 Pandari Bai
 Chandra Mohan

Soundtrack 

Soundtrack composed by Ramesh Naidu is owned by Saregama music label. Lyrics were written by Aarudhra.

Reception 
Devadasu was released on 6 December 1974. It opened with a tepid response in theatres. In 2022, Srivathsan Nadadhur of OTT Play wrote, "There are several theories surrounding the film's non-performance at the ticket window. While some claim that the film neither offered any new insight into the novel nor had any pathbreaking performances, another reason behind its failure is believed to be the re-release of ANR's Devadasu at the same time, that proved counterproductive to its fortunes."

References

External links

1974 films
Devdas films
Films scored by Ramesh Naidu
1970s Telugu-language films
1970s romance films
Films about courtesans in India
Films based on Indian novels
Films directed by Vijaya Nirmala